Oberst is a surname of Germanic origin, having originated as a topographic name for someone who lived in the highest part of a village or on a hillside, from Middle High German obrist, meaning ‘uppermost’ (later oberst), the superlative form of ober.

See also 
 Oberst (disambiguation)

References 

Occupational surnames
Surnames